A phosphine telluride refers to organophosphorus compounds with the formula R3PTe (R = alkyl or aryl).  They are structurally analogous to phosphine oxides, phosphine sulfides, and phosphine selenides.  Unlike other members of this series, the phosphine tellurides are labile with respect to loss of the chalcogen.  Nonetheless, several members have been characterized by X-ray crystallography, which reveals a tetrahedral phosphorus center with a P-Te bond length of 236 picometers. Most are colorless solids.

Phosphine tellurides are reagents used in the preparation of metal telluride nanoparticles.

References

Organophosphanes
Tellurides